James Hill (1872 – after 1900) was a Scottish footballer who played in the Football League for Burnley, New Brighton Tower and Stoke.

Career
Hill was born in Paisley and began his career as a teenager with hometown club St Mirren; following some impressive performances alongside James Dunlop, he was signed by English side Burnley. He became a vital member of the "Clarets" early league side occupying the left wing position for eight seasons and in total Hill made 163 appearances for Burnley, scoring 42 goals. He left for Stoke midway through the 1896–97 with Burnley on their way to relegation. He provided Stoke with decent service in two seasons he spent at the Victoria Ground, scoring 13 goals in 35 matches. He ended his career with the short lived New Brighton Tower.

Career statistics
Source:

References

1872 births
Year of death unknown
Scottish footballers
Association football forwards
St Mirren F.C. players
Burnley F.C. players
Stoke City F.C. players
New Brighton Tower F.C. players
English Football League players
Footballers from Paisley, Renfrewshire